The Perm constituency (No.58) is a Russian legislative constituency in Perm Krai. Until 2007 the constituency covered parts of Perm, its suburbs and rural parts up to the border with the Komi-Permyak Autonomous Okrug. After 2015 redistricting the constituency gained all of southwestern Perm Krai.

Members elected

Election results

1993

|-
! colspan=2 style="background-color:#E9E9E9;text-align:left;vertical-align:top;" |Candidate
! style="background-color:#E9E9E9;text-align:left;vertical-align:top;" |Party
! style="background-color:#E9E9E9;text-align:right;" |Votes
! style="background-color:#E9E9E9;text-align:right;" |%
|-
|style="background-color:"|
|align=left|Vladimir Zelenin
|align=left|Independent
|
|22.23%
|-
|style="background-color:"|
|align=left|Viktor Novikov
|align=left|Independent
| -
|14.30%
|-
| colspan="5" style="background-color:#E9E9E9;"|
|- style="font-weight:bold"
| colspan="3" style="text-align:left;" | Total
| 
| 100%
|-
| colspan="5" style="background-color:#E9E9E9;"|
|- style="font-weight:bold"
| colspan="4" |Source:
|
|}

1995

|-
! colspan=2 style="background-color:#E9E9E9;text-align:left;vertical-align:top;" |Candidate
! style="background-color:#E9E9E9;text-align:left;vertical-align:top;" |Party
! style="background-color:#E9E9E9;text-align:right;" |Votes
! style="background-color:#E9E9E9;text-align:right;" |%
|-
|style="background-color:"|
|align=left|Vladimir Zelenin (incumbent)
|align=left|Independent
|
|24.82%
|-
|style="background-color:"|
|align=left|Andrey Klimov
|align=left|Independent
|
|18.81%
|-
|style="background-color:"|
|align=left|Gennady Kuzmitsky
|align=left|Our Home – Russia
|
|12.58%
|-
|style="background-color:"|
|align=left|Dmitry Chumachenko
|align=left|Liberal Democratic Party
|
|6.31%
|-
|style="background-color:#1C1A0D"|
|align=left|Natalya Mishina
|align=left|Forward, Russia!
|
|4.92%
|-
|style="background-color:#DD137B"|
|align=left|Igor Averkiyev
|align=left|Social Democrats
|
|4.77%
|-
|style="background-color:"|
|align=left|Irina Zalevskaya
|align=left|Power to the People
|
|4.50%
|-
|style="background-color:#1A1A1A"|
|align=left|Boris Berestov
|align=left|Stanislav Govorukhin Bloc
|
|3.28%
|-
|style="background-color:#019CDC"|
|align=left|Nafis Sayfullin
|align=left|Party of Russian Unity and Accord
|
|1.96%
|-
|style="background-color:#000000"|
|colspan=2 |against all
|
|15.68%
|-
| colspan="5" style="background-color:#E9E9E9;"|
|- style="font-weight:bold"
| colspan="3" style="text-align:left;" | Total
| 
| 100%
|-
| colspan="5" style="background-color:#E9E9E9;"|
|- style="font-weight:bold"
| colspan="4" |Source:
|
|}

1999

|-
! colspan=2 style="background-color:#E9E9E9;text-align:left;vertical-align:top;" |Candidate
! style="background-color:#E9E9E9;text-align:left;vertical-align:top;" |Party
! style="background-color:#E9E9E9;text-align:right;" |Votes
! style="background-color:#E9E9E9;text-align:right;" |%
|-
|style="background-color:"|
|align=left|Pavel Anokhin
|align=left|Independent
|
|20.56%
|-
|style="background-color:"|
|align=left|Ilya Neustroyev
|align=left|Independent
|
|15.89%
|-
|style="background-color:#3B9EDF"|
|align=left|Yevgeny Sapiro
|align=left|Fatherland – All Russia
|
|14.01%
|-
|style="background-color:"|
|align=left|Albert Bogdanovich
|align=left|Independent
|
|7.22%
|-
|style="background-color:"|
|align=left|Mikhail Suslov
|align=left|Independent
|
|6.63%
|-
|style="background-color:"|
|align=left|Igor Ryazantsev
|align=left|Yabloko
|
|5.88%
|-
|style="background-color:"|
|align=left|Dmitry Chumachenko
|align=left|Independent
|
|4.84%
|-
|style="background-color:#7C273A"|
|align=left|Vladimir Filin
|align=left|Movement in Support of the Army
|
|1.61%
|-
|style="background-color:"|
|align=left|Igor Yakovlev
|align=left|Independent
|
|1.61%
|-
|style="background-color:#FF4400"|
|align=left|Leonid Olenev
|align=left|Andrey Nikolayev and Svyatoslav Fyodorov Bloc
|
|1.32%
|-
|style="background-color:#084284"|
|align=left|Igor Tyulenev
|align=left|Spiritual Heritage
|
|1.05%
|-
|style="background-color:#19348F"|
|align=left|Yevgeny Rukin (Rifey)
|align=left|Russian Conservative Party of Entrepreneurs
|
|0.89%
|-
|style="background-color:#000000"|
|colspan=2 |against all
|
|16.41%
|-
| colspan="5" style="background-color:#E9E9E9;"|
|- style="font-weight:bold"
| colspan="3" style="text-align:left;" | Total
| 
| 100%
|-
| colspan="5" style="background-color:#E9E9E9;"|
|- style="font-weight:bold"
| colspan="4" |Source:
|
|}

2003

|-
! colspan=2 style="background-color:#E9E9E9;text-align:left;vertical-align:top;" |Candidate
! style="background-color:#E9E9E9;text-align:left;vertical-align:top;" |Party
! style="background-color:#E9E9E9;text-align:right;" |Votes
! style="background-color:#E9E9E9;text-align:right;" |%
|-
|style="background-color:"|
|align=left|Pavel Anokhin (incumbent)
|align=left|Independent
|
|30.56%
|-
|style="background-color:#1042A5"|
|align=left|Ilya Neustroyev
|align=left|Union of Right Forces
|
|20.44%
|-
|style="background-color:"|
|align=left|Vyacheslav Vakhrin
|align=left|Independent
|
|13.35%
|-
|style="background-color:"|
|align=left|Vladimir Korsun
|align=left|Communist Party
|
|4.42%
|-
|style="background-color:"|
|align=left|Aleksandr Mubarakshin
|align=left|Agrarian Party
|
|3.07%
|-
|style="background-color:"|
|align=left|Irina Cherepanova
|align=left|Independent
|
|3.04%
|-
|style="background-color:"|
|align=left|Aleksey Chernykh
|align=left|Rodina
|
|2.59%
|-
|style="background-color:"|
|align=left|Igor Nevorotov
|align=left|Liberal Democratic Party
|
|1.82%
|-
|style="background-color:"|
|align=left|Sergey Semenov
|align=left|Independent
|
|1.05%
|-
|style="background-color:"|
|align=left|Khalil Abdrashitov
|align=left|Independent
|
|0.87%
|-
|style="background-color:#000000"|
|colspan=2 |against all
|
|16.74%
|-
| colspan="5" style="background-color:#E9E9E9;"|
|- style="font-weight:bold"
| colspan="3" style="text-align:left;" | Total
| 
| 100%
|-
| colspan="5" style="background-color:#E9E9E9;"|
|- style="font-weight:bold"
| colspan="4" |Source:
|
|}

2016

|-
! colspan=2 style="background-color:#E9E9E9;text-align:left;vertical-align:top;" |Candidate
! style="background-color:#E9E9E9;text-align:left;vertical-align:top;" |Party
! style="background-color:#E9E9E9;text-align:right;" |Votes
! style="background-color:#E9E9E9;text-align:right;" |%
|-
|style="background-color: " |
|align=left|Igor Shubin
|align=left|United Russia
|
|40.76%
|-
|style="background-color:"|
|align=left|Vladimir Alikin
|align=left|A Just Russia
|
|11.30%
|-
|style="background-color:"|
|align=left|Olga Rogozhnikova
|align=left|Liberal Democratic Party
|
|10.53%
|-
|style="background-color:"|
|align=left|Aleksey Selyutin
|align=left|Communist Party
|
|9.88%
|-
|style="background-color: "|
|align=left|Viktor Pokhmelkin
|align=left|Party of Growth
|
|9.46%
|-
|style="background-color: " |
|align=left|Oleg Myasnikov
|align=left|Yabloko
|
|3.39%
|-
|style="background:"| 
|align=left|Yevgeny Skobelin
|align=left|Communists of Russia
|
|2.96%
|-
|style="background:"| 
|align=left|Almir Amayev
|align=left|People's Freedom Party
|
|2.15%
|-
|style="background-color:"|
|align=left|Andrey Tribunsky
|align=left|The Greens
|
|2.07%
|-
| colspan="5" style="background-color:#E9E9E9;"|
|- style="font-weight:bold"
| colspan="3" style="text-align:left;" | Total
| 
| 100%
|-
| colspan="5" style="background-color:#E9E9E9;"|
|- style="font-weight:bold"
| colspan="4" |Source:
|
|}

2021

|-
! colspan=2 style="background-color:#E9E9E9;text-align:left;vertical-align:top;" |Candidate
! style="background-color:#E9E9E9;text-align:left;vertical-align:top;" |Party
! style="background-color:#E9E9E9;text-align:right;" |Votes
! style="background-color:#E9E9E9;text-align:right;" |%
|-
|style="background-color: " |
|align=left|Igor Shubin (incumbent)
|align=left|United Russia
|
|29.99%
|-
|style="background-color:"|
|align=left|Olesya Gorbunova
|align=left|Communist Party
|
|23.20%
|-
|style="background-color:"|
|align=left|Arkady Nepryakhin
|align=left|A Just Russia — For Truth
|
|11.41%
|-
|style="background-color: " |
|align=left|Denis Shitov
|align=left|New People
|
|9.14%
|-
|style="background-color:"|
|align=left|Aleksey Balandin
|align=left|Liberal Democratic Party
|
|7.54%
|-
|style="background:"| 
|align=left|Yevgeny Lyubimov
|align=left|Communists of Russia
|
|5.38%
|-
|style="background-color: "|
|align=left|Vladimir Romanov
|align=left|Party of Pensioners
|
|5.22%
|-
| colspan="5" style="background-color:#E9E9E9;"|
|- style="font-weight:bold"
| colspan="3" style="text-align:left;" | Total
| 
| 100%
|-
| colspan="5" style="background-color:#E9E9E9;"|
|- style="font-weight:bold"
| colspan="4" |Source:
|
|}

Notes

References

Russian legislative constituencies
Politics of Perm Krai